John "Jocko" Milligan (August 8, 1861 – August 29, 1923) was an American professional baseball player who played catcher in Major League Baseball from 1884 to 1893. He played for the Philadelphia Athletics, St. Louis Browns, Philadelphia Athletics, Washington Senators, Baltimore Orioles, and New York Giants.

In 772 games over 10 seasons, Milligan posted a .286 batting average (848-for-2964) with 440 runs, 189 doubles, 50 triples, 49 home runs, 497 runs batted in, 210 bases on balls, .341 on-base percentage, and .433 slugging percentage.

Milligan died on August 29, 1923 in Philadelphia, Pennsylvania and is interred at Mount Moriah Cemetery.

See also
 List of Major League Baseball annual doubles leaders

References

External links

1861 births
1923 deaths
19th-century baseball players
Major League Baseball catchers
Philadelphia Athletics (AA) players
St. Louis Browns (AA) players
Philadelphia Athletics (PL) players
Philadelphia Athletics (AA 1891) players
Washington Senators (1891–1899) players
Baltimore Orioles (NL) players
New York Giants (NL) players
Minor league baseball managers
Pottsville Antharcites players
Binghamton Bingoes players
Allentown Buffaloes players
Allentown Kelly's Killers players
Easton (minor league baseball) players
Ashland (minor league baseball) players
Allentown Goobers players
Pottsville Colts players
Shamokin Actives players
Reading Actives players
Philadelphia Athletics (minor league) players
Baseball players from Philadelphia
Burials at Mount Moriah Cemetery (Philadelphia)